The BYD Seal is a battery electric, compact executive fastback sedan produced by BYD Auto. It is the second passenger car of BYD's latest "Ocean Series" of plug-in electric vehicles, after the smaller hatchback BYD Dolphin. In several overseas markets, the left hand drive variant of the BYD Seal is marketed as the BYD Atto 4.

Overview

The BYD Seal is built on the e-Platform 3.0, BYD's new 800-volt car platform, while the design was unveiled as the BYD Ocean-X Concept in September 2021.

There are three models of powertrains offered, with a  single-motor rear wheel drive,  single-motor rear wheel drive, and a 160kW + 230kW dual-motor all wheel drive option. The car has vehicle-to-grid capability.

References

Cars introduced in 2022
Electric car models
Seal
Rear-wheel-drive vehicles
All-wheel-drive vehicles
Sports sedans
Production electric cars
Executive cars
Cars of China
2020s cars